In mathematics, the Silverman–Toeplitz theorem, first proved by Otto Toeplitz, is a result in summability theory characterizing matrix summability methods that are regular. A regular matrix summability method is a matrix transformation of a convergent sequence which preserves the limit.

An infinite matrix  with complex-valued entries defines a regular summability method if and only if it satisfies all of the following properties:

 

An example is Cesaro summation, a matrix summability method with

References

Citations

Further reading
 Toeplitz, Otto (1911) "Über allgemeine lineare Mittelbildungen." Prace mat.-fiz., 22, 113–118 (the original paper in German)
 Silverman, Louis Lazarus (1913) "On the definition of the sum of a divergent series." University of Missouri Studies, Math. Series I, 1–96
 , 43-48.
 

Theorems in analysis
Summability methods
Summability theory